Kári Kristján Kristjánsson (born 28 October 1984) is an Icelandic handball player for ÍBV and the Icelandic national team.

He competed for the Icelandic national team at the 2012 Summer Olympics in London.

References

External links

1984 births
Living people
Kari Kristjansson
Kari Kristjansson
Kari Kristjansson
Handball players at the 2012 Summer Olympics
Kari Kristjansson
HSG Wetzlar players
Handball-Bundesliga players
Kari Kristjansson
Expatriate handball players
Kari Kristjansson
Kari Kristjansson
Kari Kristjansson